Henry Llewelyn (12 September 1855 –  6 August 1933) was a member the Queensland Legislative Council.

Llewelyn was born at Merthyr Tydfil, Wales, to Henry Llewelyn and his wife Elizabeth. He arrived in Australia in 1885 and headed to Gympie to work as a gold miner. In later years he opened a bookshop and stationer which he ran for 34 years.

Political career
When the Labour Party starting forming governments in Queensland, it found much of its legislation being blocked by a hostile Council, where members had been appointed for life by successive conservative governments. After a failed referendum in May 1917, Premier Ryan tried a new tactic, and later that year advised the Governor, Sir Hamilton John Goold-Adams, to appoint thirteen new members whose allegiance lay with Labour to the Council.

Llewelyn was one of the thirteen new members, and went on to serve for four and a half years until the Council was abolished in March, 1922.

Personal life
Llewelyn was twice married, firstly to Eleanor Davies at Wales in 1874. Eleanor died in 1891 and he then married Mary Ann McNamee (died 1936) at Gympie in 1895. His marriages resulted in twelve children, including Evan Llewelyn who went on to be the Labor member for the state seat of Toowoomba.

He died in Brisbane in August 1933 and was buried at Toowong Cemetery.

References

Members of the Queensland Legislative Council
1855 births
1933 deaths
Australian Labor Party members of the Parliament of Queensland
Burials at Toowong Cemetery
Welsh politicians